The 1931 Loyola Lions football team was an American football team that represented Loyola University of Los Angeles (now known as Loyola Marymount University) as an independent during the 1931 college football season. In their second season under head coach Tom Lieb, the Lions compiled a 7–2–1 record.

Schedule

References

Loyola
Loyola Lions football seasons
Loyola Lions football